Puqin Kancha (other spellings Poken Kancha, Poquencancha) is an archaeological site near Cusco in Peru. It is situated in the Cusco Region, Cusco Province, Santiago District. The site consists of a wall on the mountain Puqin (Puquin). Puqin Kancha is protected by the Peruvian state by General Law No. 28296.

References

Archaeological sites in Cusco Region
Archaeological sites in Peru